The 1937–38 Ohio Bobcats men's basketball team represented Ohio University. Butch Grover was the head coach in his final season for Ohio. The Bobcats played their home games at the Men's Gymnasium.  They finished the season 12–8 and 4–6 in the Buckeye Athletic Association.

Schedule

|-
!colspan=9 style=| Regular Season

Source:

References

Ohio Bobcats men's basketball seasons
Ohio
Ohio Bobcats
Ohio Bobcats